Angaria delphinus, common name the common delphinula, is a species of sea snail, a marine gastropod mollusc of the family Angariidae.

Description
The shell of this species is variable in degree of sculpture, depending on how exposed or sheltered the environment is in which the snail lives. These different forms are called ecomorphs.  The shells can reach 73 mm in size.

Distribution 
This species is found in shallow intertidal waters, usually on rocky shorelines and in reef flats. It is native to the Central Indo-Pacific, from Northern Australia and New Caledonia to Japan, Southeast Asia, and the Andaman Sea.

References

 Poppe G.T. & Goto Y. (1993) Recent Angariidae. Ancona: Informatore Piceno. 32 pls, 10 pls
 Dautzenberg, P. (1923). Liste preliminaire des mollusques marins de Madagascar et description de deux especes nouvelles. Journal de Conchyliologie 68: 21-74.
 Dautzenberg, Ph. (1929). Mollusques testaces marins de Madagascar. Faune des Colonies Francaises, Tome III.
 Monsecour K. & Monsecour D. (2006) The genus Angaria Röding, 1798 (Gastropoda: Turbinidae) in New Caledonia, with description of a new species. Visaya 1(6): 9-16.

External links 

 http://eol.org/pages/10202293

Angariidae
Gastropods described in 1758
Taxa named by Carl Linnaeus